In number theory, an aurifeuillean factorization, named after Léon-François-Antoine Aurifeuille, is a special type of algebraic factorization that comes from non-trivial factorizations of cyclotomic polynomials over the integers. Although cyclotomic polynomials themselves are irreducible over the integers, when restricted to particular integer values they may have an algebraic factorization, as in the examples below.

Examples 

 Numbers of the form  have the following aurifeuillean factorization (see also Sophie Germain's identity):
 

 

 Numbers of the form  have the following aurifeuillean factorization (the first factor is the algebraic factorization of sum of two cubes):
 

 

  and 
  and 

 When the number is of a particular form (the exact expression varies with the base), Aurifeuillian factorization may be used, which gives a product of two or three numbers. The following equations give Aurifeuillian factors for the Cunningham project bases as a product of F, L and M:

 If we let L = C − D, M = C + D, the Aurifeuillian factorizations for bn ± 1 of the form F * (C − D) * (C + D) = F * L * M with the bases 2 ≤ b ≤ 24 (perfect powers excluded, since a power of bn is also a power of b) are: 

 (for the coefficients of the polynomials for all square-free bases up to 199 and up to 998, see )

 {|class="wikitable" style="text-align:center"
!b
!Number
!(C − D) * (C + D) = L * M
!F
!C
!D
|-
!2
|24k + 2 + 1
|
|1
|22k + 1 + 1
|2k + 1
|-
!3
|36k + 3 + 1
|
|32k + 1 + 1
|32k + 1 + 1
|3k + 1
|-
!5
|510k + 5 - 1
|
|52k + 1 - 1
|54k + 2 + 3(52k + 1) + 1
|53k + 2 + 5k + 1
|-
!6
|612k + 6 + 1
|
|64k + 2 + 1
|64k + 2 + 3(62k + 1) + 1
|63k + 2 + 6k + 1
|-
!7
|714k + 7 + 1
|
|72k + 1 + 1
|76k + 3 + 3(74k + 2) + 3(72k + 1) + 1
|75k + 3 + 73k + 2 + 7k + 1
|-
!10
|1020k + 10 + 1
|
|104k + 2 + 1
|108k + 4 + 5(106k + 3) + 7(104k + 2) + 5(102k + 1) + 1
|107k + 4 + 2(105k + 3) + 2(103k + 2) + 10k + 1
|-
!11
|1122k + 11 + 1
|
|112k + 1 + 1
|1110k + 5 + 5(118k + 4) - 116k + 3 - 114k + 2 + 5(112k + 1) + 1
|119k + 5 + 117k + 4 - 115k + 3 + 113k + 2 + 11k + 1
|-
!12
|126k + 3 + 1
|
|122k + 1 + 1
|122k + 1 + 1
|6(12k)
|-
!13
|1326k + 13 - 1
|
|132k + 1 - 1
|1312k + 6 + 7(1310k + 5) + 15(138k + 4) + 19(136k + 3) + 15(134k + 2) + 7(132k + 1) + 1
|1311k + 6 + 3(139k + 5) + 5(137k + 4) + 5(135k + 3) + 3(133k + 2) + 13k + 1
|-
!14
|1428k + 14 + 1
|
|144k + 2 + 1
|1412k + 6 + 7(1410k + 5) + 3(148k + 4) - 7(146k + 3) + 3(144k + 2) + 7(142k + 1) + 1
|1411k + 6 + 2(149k + 5) - 147k + 4 - 145k + 3 + 2(143k + 2) + 14k + 1
|-
!15
|1530k + 15 + 1
|
|1514k + 7 - 1512k + 6 + 1510k + 5 + 154k + 2 - 152k + 1 + 1
|158k + 4 + 8(156k + 3) + 13(154k + 2) + 8(152k + 1) + 1
|157k + 4 + 3(155k + 3) + 3(153k + 2) + 15k + 1
|-
!17
|1734k + 17 - 1
|
|172k + 1 - 1
|1716k + 8 + 9(1714k + 7) + 11(1712k + 6) - 5(1710k + 5) - 15(178k + 4) - 5(176k + 3) + 11(174k + 2) + 9(172k + 1) + 1
|1715k + 8 + 3(1713k + 7) + 1711k + 6 - 3(179k + 5) - 3(177k + 4) + 175k + 3 + 3(173k + 2) + 17k + 1
|-
!18
|184k + 2 + 1
|
|1
|182k + 1 + 1
|6(18k)
|-
!19
|1938k + 19 + 1
|
|192k + 1 + 1
|1918k + 9 + 9(1916k + 8) + 17(1914k + 7) + 27(1912k + 6) + 31(1910k + 5) + 31(198k + 4) + 27(196k + 3) + 17(194k + 2) + 9(192k + 1) + 1
|1917k + 9 + 3(1915k + 8) + 5(1913k + 7) + 7(1911k + 6) + 7(199k + 5) + 7(197k + 4) + 5(195k + 3) + 3(193k + 2) + 19k + 1
|-
!20
|2010k + 5 - 1
|
|202k + 1 - 1
|204k + 2 + 3(202k + 1) + 1
|10(203k + 1) + 10(20k)
|-
!21
|2142k + 21 - 1
|
|2118k + 9 + 2116k + 8 + 2114k + 7 - 214k + 2 - 212k + 1 - 1
|2112k + 6 + 10(2110k + 5) + 13(218k + 4) + 7(216k + 3) + 13(214k + 2) + 10(212k + 1) + 1
|2111k + 6 + 3(219k + 5) + 2(217k + 4) + 2(215k + 3) + 3(213k + 2) + 21k + 1
|-
!22
|2244k + 22 + 1
|
|224k + 2 + 1
|2220k + 10 + 11(2218k + 9) + 27(2216k + 8) + 33(2214k + 7) + 21(2212k + 6) + 11(2210k + 5) + 21(228k + 4) + 33(226k + 3) + 27(224k + 2) + 11(222k + 1) + 1
|2219k + 10 + 4(2217k + 9) + 7(2215k + 8) + 6(2213k + 7) + 3(2211k + 6) + 3(229k + 5) + 6(227k + 4) + 7(225k + 3) + 4(223k + 2) + 22k + 1
|-
!23
|2346k + 23 + 1
|
|232k + 1 + 1
|2322k + 11 + 11(2320k + 10) + 9(2318k + 9) - 19(2316k + 8) - 15(2314k + 7) + 25(2312k + 6) + 25(2310k + 5) - 15(238k + 4) - 19(236k + 3) + 9(234k + 2) + 11(232k + 1) + 1
|2321k + 11 + 3(2319k + 10) - 2317k + 9 - 5(2315k + 8) + 2313k + 7 + 7(2311k + 6) + 239k + 5 - 5(237k + 4) - 235k + 3 + 3(233k + 2) + 23k + 1
|-
!24
|2412k + 6 + 1
|
|244k + 2 + 1
|244k + 2 + 3(242k + 1) + 1
|12(243k + 1) + 12(24k)
|}

 Lucas numbers  have the following aurifeuillean factorization:
 

History 
In 1869, before the discovery of Aurifeuillean factorizations, through a tremendous manual effort, obtained the following factorization into primes:

Of course, Landry's full factorization follows from this (taking out the obvious factor of 5). The general form of the factorization was later discovered by Lucas.

536903681 is an example of a Gaussian Mersenne norm.

References

External links 
 Aurifeuillian Factorisation, Colin Barker
 Online factor collection

Number theory
factorization